This is a list of banks in Andorra.

 Andbank
 Banc Sabadell d'Andorra ('A)
 Banca Privada d'Andorra (BPA), under resolution.
 Crèdit Andorrà
 
 Mora Banc Grup
 , created May 2016, inherits BPA assets.

Banks
Andorra
Andorra